Still Life II is a sculpture by Catalan artist Juli González done in the 1920s, and currently exhibited at the National Art Museum of Catalonia.

Description 
González moved to Paris at the beginning of the twentieth century and focussed on painting and metalwork. It was not until the end of the 1920s that he opted definitively for sculpture and became a notable figure in the European avant-gardes. Based on his formal experiments using iron, he created a sculptural language of his own. According to the National Art Museum of Catalonia, Still Life II illustrates his masterly ability to combine matter and void and to extract unsuspected expressive possibilities from a simple sheet of iron.

References

External links 
 The artwork at Museum's website

Sculptures of the Museu Nacional d'Art de Catalunya
1920s in Spain